Marc Anthony Pelosi (born June 17, 1994) is an American former professional
soccer player who played as a midfielder.

Career

Youth
Pelosi was born in Bad Säckingen, Germany, but moved to California during his youth and spent years with U.S. Soccer Development Academy club De Anza Force Academy in the San Francisco Bay Area.  On November 8, 2011, Pelosi joined Premier League side Liverpool. On February 17, 2013, in a match for the under-21 team, Pelosi suffered a double fracture on his right leg that ruled him out for over a year. He signed a new contract with the club while recuperating from his injury, however, he was released by the club at the end of that contract on June 10, 2015.

Professional
On July 17, 2015, Pelosi returned to the US and signed with his hometown MLS side San Jose Earthquakes.  He made his professional debut on July 26 in a 3–1 defeat to Vancouver Whitecaps FC. Pelosi was sidelined for the entirety of the 2016 season due to knee issues and did not return to the squad until appearing off the bench in the 63rd minute during San Jose's 4–1 friendly victory over Eintracht Frankfurt on July 14, 2017. Following this appearance, Pelosi appeared on loan at Reno 1868 FC, named to the bench in the team's August 12 match against San Antonio FC. He was released by San Jose on November 27, 2017.

International
Pelosi represented the United States in every youth level.  He was the captain for the under-17 national team at the 2011 FIFA U-20 World Cup.  He was also a member of the under-23 side that took third place in the 2015 Toulon Tournament.

On January 9, 2015, Pelosi received his first senior call up for friendlies against Chile and Panama, but he did not feature in either of the matches.

Personal life 
Marc Pelosi is a distant relative of Paul Pelosi, husband of the current Speaker of the House, Nancy Pelosi, although the two have never formally met. After retiring, he moved to Park City, Utah, where he invests in cryptocurrency, real estate, and private equity.

Pelosi attended high school at Bellarmine College Preparatory for a year before transferring to IMG Academy. He turned down an offer from UCLA to sign with Liverpool.

Honors 
United States U17
CONCACAF U-17 Championship: 2011

References

External links

USSF Development Academy bio
U.S. Soccer bio

1994 births
Living people
American soccer players
Liverpool F.C. players
San Jose Earthquakes players
Reno 1868 FC players
Association football midfielders
Soccer players from California
Sportspeople from Sunnyvale, California
Major League Soccer players
USL Championship players
United States men's youth international soccer players
United States men's under-20 international soccer players
United States men's under-23 international soccer players
American people of German descent
American people of Italian descent
American expatriate soccer players
Expatriate footballers in England
IMG Academy alumni
People from Park City, Utah
Pelosi family
De Anza Force players